Mahuninga is an administrative ward in the Iringa Rural district of the Iringa Region of Tanzania. In 2016 the Tanzania National Bureau of Statistics report there were 4,532 people in the ward, from 4,331 in 2012.

Villages / vitongoji 
The ward has 3 villages and 13 vitongoji.

 Mahuninga
 Kitalingolo
 Majengo A
 Majengo B
 Ufyambe
 Kisilwa
 Isukutwa
 Kisilwa
 Misufi
 Makifu
 Isanga
 Mahove
 Makambalala-A
 Makambalala-B
 Makifu
 Mkanisoka

References 

Wards of Iringa Region